MAPP gas was a trademarked name, belonging to The Linde Group, a division of the former global chemical giant Union Carbide, for a fuel gas based on a stabilized mixture of methylacetylene (propyne), propadiene and propane. The name comes from the original chemical composition, methylacetylene-propadiene propane. "MAPP gas" is also widely used as a generic name for UN 1060 stabilised methylacetylene-propadiene (unstabilised methylacetylene-propadiene is known as MAPD).

MAPP gas is widely regarded as a safer and easier-to-use substitute for acetylene. In early 2008, true MAPP gas production ended in North America when production was discontinued at the only remaining plant in North America that still manufactured it. However, many current products labeled "MAPP" are, in fact, MAPP substitutes. These versions contain mostly propylene with some propane, dimethyl ether is included as a 3rd ingredient in some versions.

Use
Genuine MAPP gas can be used in combination with oxygen for heating, soldering, brazing and even welding because of its high flame temperature of 2925 °C (5300 °F) in oxygen. Although acetylene has a higher flame temperature  (3160 °C, 5720 °F), MAPP has the advantage that it requires neither dilution nor special container fillers during transport, allowing a greater volume of fuel gas to be transported at the same given weight, and it is much safer in use.

A MAPP/oxygen flame is not entirely appropriate for welding steel, due to the high concentration of hydrogen in the flame – higher than acetylene, but lower than any of the other petroleum fuel gases. The hydrogen infuses into the molten steel and renders the welds brittle. For small-scale welding with MAPP this is not a serious problem, as the hydrogen escapes readily, and MAPP/oxygen can in practice be used for welding small steel parts.

MAPP/oxygen was advantageously used in underwater cutting, which requires high gas pressures (under such pressures acetylene can decompose explosively, making it dangerous to use). However, underwater oxy/fuel gas cutting of any kind has been largely replaced by exothermic cutting because it cuts more quickly and safely.

MAPP gas is also used in combustion with air for brazing and soldering, where it has a slight advantage over competing propane fuel because of its higher combustion temperature of 2,020 °C (3,670 °F) in air.

The biggest disadvantage of MAPP gas is cost; it is typically one-and-a-half times as expensive as propane at the refinery, and up to four times as expensive to the consumer. It is no longer used much in any large-scale industry – for larger scale users acetylene/oxygen is more economic than MAPP/oxygen when high flame temperatures are needed, and propane/air is more economic when big overall heating is needed.

However, for the small-scale user a MAPP/oxygen flame is still highly desirable, having higher flame temperatures and energy densities than any flame other than acetylene/oxygen, but without the dangers and inconveniences of acetylene/oxygen. Jewellers, glassbead makers, and many others find it very useful. Plumbers, refrigeration and HVAC engineers and other tradesmen also value the high heat capacity of the MAPP/air flame; MAPP was until recently widely used, supplied in small to medium size containers.

Blowtorches are used to brown and sear food cooked by low-temperature sous-vide techniques. Myhrvold recommends in Modernist cuisine: the art and science of cooking that MAPP gases should be used in preference to cheaper butane or propane as they produce higher temperatures with less risk of giving the food a gas flavour, as can happen with incompletely combusted gas.

Physical properties
MAPP is colorless in both liquid and gas form.  The gas has a pronounced acetylene-like or fishy odor at concentrations above 100 ppm, due to the addition of substituted amines as a polymerization inhibitor. Low molecular weight alkynes have strong odors. MAPP gas is toxic if inhaled at high concentrations.

The composition of the supplied gas has varied widely, with the gases as supplied by different repackagers/resellers at any one time varying, as well as the general composition varying over time, but a typical composition for an early Dow gas might be: methylacetylene (propyne) 48%, propadiene 23%, propane 27%. For a later Dow/Petromont gas propyne 30%, propadiene 14%, propylene 43%, propane 7%, C4H10 (isobutane, butane) 6% might be more typical.

Thermal properties
MAPP has an energy content of 21000  BTU/lb (13.57 kWh/kg) while acetylene's energy content is 25000  BTU/lb (16.15 kWh/kg).

Safety 
People can be exposed to MAPP gas or its substitutes in the workplace by inhaling the gas or skin/eye contact with the liquid. The Occupational Safety and Health Administration (OSHA) has set the legal limit for MAPP gas exposure in the workplace as 1000 ppm (1800 mg/m3) over an 8-hour workday. The National Institute for Occupational Safety and Health (NIOSH) has set a recommended exposure limit (REL) of 1000 ppm (1800 mg/m3) over an 8-hour workday and 1250 ppm (2250 mg/m3) for short-term exposure. At levels of 3400 ppm, 10% of the lower explosive limit, MAPP gas is immediately dangerous to life and health.

See also
Methylacetylene-propadiene gas (MPS gas)
Brazing
Oxy-fuel welding
Forge welding
Arc Welding

References

Brazing and soldering
Fuel gas